K14 may refer to:
 K-14 (Kansas highway)
 K-14 education
 K-14 process, a photographic film developing process
 , a submarine of the Royal Navy
 IAR K14, a Romanian aircraft engine
 Kimpo Air Base, now Gimpo International Airport, established during the Korean War
 Nissan Micra (K14), a Japanese subcompact car
 S&T Motiv K14, a South Korean sniper rifle
 Sonata in C, K. 14, by Wolfgang Amadeus Mozart